Sturgate Airfield  is an aerodrome located  north of Lincoln, Lincolnshire, England. Originally opened in 1944 as RAF Sturgate, the airfield was planned as an operational bomber air station, but opened too late to see active use. The RAF station was closed down between 1946 and 1953, but saw further service as a Royal Air Force base until 1964, providing a stop for USAF SAC fighter units being relocated to other bases. Owned and operated by Eastern Air Executive Ltd  Sturgate airfield has recently undergone improvement works since acquisition by the MPS Group of Companies. Further improvements to runway airfield infrastructure and facilities are continuing.

Eastern Air Executive
EAE has a hangar at the Airport. It performs maintenance services on light aircraft.

External links
Sturgate profile, Eastern Air Executive Ltd 
Sturgate profile, Control Towers Co. UK

Airports in England
Airports in Lincolnshire